Matihani Assembly constituency is an assembly constituency in Begusarai district in the Indian state of Bihar.

Overview
As per Delimitation of Parliamentary and Assembly constituencies Order, 2008, No. 144 Matihani Assembly constituency is composed of the following: Matihani and Shambo Akha Kurha community development blocks; Kaithma, Laduwara, Bhairwar, Maniappa, Chilmil, Dumri, Ulao, Sighaul, Pachmba, Mahmadpur Raghunathpur, Mohan Eghu, Shahpur, Bishanpur, Dhabauli, Bindpur, Puspura, Bahadarpur, Amraur Kiratpur, Rachiyahi gram panchayats of Begusarai CD Block; Barauni IOC Township (CT); and Keshawe, Noorpur, Mahna and Mosadpur gram panchayats of Barauni CD Block.

Matihani Assembly constituency is part of No. 24 Begusarai (Lok Sabha constituency) and as per the delimitation in 2008, falls within Begusarai town.

Members of Legislative Assembly

Election results

2020

2015

1957 General elections
The first instance of booth capturing in India was recorded in 1957 in the General Elections of that year in Rachiyahi, in Begusarai's Matihani assembly seat.

1977-2010
In the 2010 state assembly elections, Narendra Kumar Singh of JD(U) won the Matihani seat defeating his nearest rival Abhay Kumar Sarjan of Congress.  Contests in most years were multi cornered but only winners and runners up are being mentioned. Narendra Kumar Singh, Independent, defeated Abhay Kumar Singh of Congress in Bihar Assembly Election, October 2005 and Rajendra Rajan of CPI in February 2005. Rajendra Rajan of CPI defeated Pramod Kumar Sharma of Congress in 2000, 1995 and 1990, Pramod Kumar Sharma of Congress/ Congress(I) defeated Deoki Nandan Singh of CPI in 1985 and 1980, Sitaram Mishra of CPI defeated Mithilesh Kumar Singh of Janata Party in 1977.

References

External links
 

Assembly constituencies of Bihar
Politics of Begusarai district